Anna Clarice Conwi Patrimonio (born November 25, 1993 in Manila) is a Filipino female tennis player.

First year Playing for Philippines at the 2011 Fed Cup, Patrimonio has a win–loss record of 30–19.

At the 2011 Southeast Asian Games, held in Palembang in Indonesia Patrimonio won two medals.

Personal life
Anna Clarice is the third child of basketball superstar Alvin Patrimonio and Cindy Conwi, with her older brother Angelo and younger sibling Asher. Anna Clarice's older sister Tin Patrimonio is also a tennis player. She started playing tennis at the age of 8.

Anna Clarice gave birth to her first child with her partner, former Ateneo Blue Eagles basketball star Jobe Nkemakolam, on September 1, 2020.

Fed Cup Result: (30-19)

Singles: (13-13)

Doubles: (17-6)

References

External links 
 
 
 

1993 births
Living people
Sportspeople from Manila
Filipino female tennis players
Southeast Asian Games silver medalists for the Philippines
Southeast Asian Games bronze medalists for the Philippines
Southeast Asian Games medalists in tennis
Competitors at the 2011 Southeast Asian Games
Competitors at the 2015 Southeast Asian Games
Competitors at the 2017 Southeast Asian Games